Vania is a genus of benthic forams from the upper Paleocene of Turkey with a large discoidal test up to 6.5mm in diameter. The microspheric test begins with a short planispiral stage, later chambers spreading successively from flabelliform (fan-shaped) to reniform (kidney-shaped) and finally annular. The interior is subdivided by radial primary beams intercalated with secondary beams. The wall finely agglutinated, imperforate; aperture, two alternating rows of pores on the periphery.

References 

Vania in GSI Paleontology 

Loftusiida
Prehistoric Foraminifera genera
Paleocene life